Neustetten is a municipality in the district of Tübingen in Baden-Württemberg in Germany

Mayors
1964–2004: Rudolf Maier
since 2004: Gunter Schmid

Sons and daughters of the town
 Heinrich Christoph Wilhelm Sigwart (1789–1844), born in the district Remmingsheim, General Superintendent of the Evangelical Lutheran Church in Hall, member of Parliament
 Richard Schuh (1920–1949), born in the district Remmingsheim, was the last in West Germany executed criminal

References

Towns in Baden-Württemberg
Tübingen (district)